Hananiah ben Hezekiah ben Garon (or in short חנניה בן חזקיה, "Hananiah ben [Son of] Hezekiah") was a Jewish Tanna sage, contemporary of House of Shammai and House of Hillel.

He is recounted as being one of several sages who weighed in on the question of the canonization of the Book of Ezekiel. It is said that he took 300 barrels of oil along with him, and shut himself in the aliyah (upper chamber) of his house of study, where he looked up and studied their claims, until he was able to resolve the contradictions of the Book of Ezekiel. Some sources identify this story with his son, Eleazar ben Hananiah. The Talmud sums up the matter: "Rav Judah said in Rav's name: In truth, that man, Hananiah son of Hezekiah by name, is to be remembered for blessing. If it were not him, the Book of Ezekiel would have been hidden."

The Talmud attributes authorship of Megillat Taanit to Hananiah ben Hezekiah.

See also
Megillat Taanit

References

Mishnah rabbis